Ecuador competed at the 2020 Summer Paralympics in Tokyo, Japan, from 24 August to 5 September 2021.

On 29 August 2021, the country won its first two Paralympic medals in its Paralympics history through Mendez sister Poleth Isamar Mendes Sanchez and Anaís Méndez 

Poleth Isamar Mendes Sanchez won Ecuador's first Paralympic gold medal with a new world record of 14.39 in the women's F20 shot put event during the 2020 Summer Paralympics. Coincidentally, her sister Anaís Méndez also won bronze medal in the same discipline making it a rare instance of athletes coming from same family who go on to win medals in a same competition. Poleth Isamar Mendes Sanchez won Ecuador's first ever gold medal in Paralympics history while her younger sister Anaís Méndez won Ecuador's first ever bronze medal in Paralympics history. Prior to the 2020 Summer Paralympics, Ecuador had never won a Paralympic medal.

Medalists

Athletics 

Four Ecuadorian athletes (Damian Josue Carcelen Delgado, Anderson Alexander Colorado Mina, Roberto Carlos Chala Espinoza & Kiara Rodriguez) successfully broke through the qualifications for the 2020 Paralympics after breaking the qualification limit.

DQ: Disqualified | SB: Season Best | Q: Qualified by place or standard based on overall position after heats | DNM: Did not mark | DNA: Did not advance | N/A: Not available, stage was not contested | PB: Personal Best | WR: World Record | PR: Paralympic Record | AR: Area Record

Track

Field

See also 
Ecuador at the Paralympics
Ecuador at the 2020 Summer Olympics

References 

2020
Nations at the 2020 Summer Paralympics
2021 in Ecuadorian sport